The  (officially stylized as Pokémon mini) is a handheld game console that was designed and manufactured by Nintendo and themed around the Pokémon media franchise. It is the smallest game system with interchangeable cartridges ever produced by Nintendo, weighing just under . It was first released in North America on November 16, 2001, (two days before the GameCube was released) then in Japan on December 14, 2001, and in Europe on March 15, 2002. The systems were released in three colors: Wooper Blue, Chikorita Green, and Smoochum Purple.

Features of the Pokémon mini include an internal real-time clock, an infrared port used to facilitate multiplayer gaming, a reed switch for detecting shakes, and a motor used to implement force feedback. Pokémon Channel features playable emulated demo versions of Pokémon Mini games, including the console exclusive "Snorlax's Lunch Time". Only ten games were released worldwide, half of which were exclusive to Japan and one that was never released in North America but everywhere else.

Various hackers have reverse engineered the Pokémon mini (with the aid of the aforementioned emulator in Pokémon Channel) in order to enable the creation of homebrew games, and to allow official games to be played on other platforms (such as a PC, Dreamcast and various others).

Technical details 
 CPU 8-bit, 4 MHz Epson S1C88
 96 x 64 pixel monochrome LCD
 Game Pak (512KiB cartridge)
 Internal BIOS of 4kB
 Internal RAM 4kB (shared with video subsystem)
 21-bit cartridge bus
 256 hardware register; in most cases Open-Bus registers
 Dimensions: 
 Weight:  with Game Pak and AAA battery inserted
 Power: 1 AAA battery (lasting ~60 hours)

List of games 
The games were published in Japan by The Pokémon Company and in other countries by Nintendo.

In all three regions the console was released, the Pokémon mini handheld launched with four (five in Europe) games that could be bought separately:
  A collection of several minigames, included with the Pokémon mini. The minigames include: Hitmonchan's Boxing, where the player shakes the system to 'punch'; Pikachu's Rocket Start, a game where the player has to launch off a starting line before another Pokémon; Bellossom's Dance, a Dance Dance Revolution-like game; Chansey's Dribble, in which the player kicks a ball to the finish line as quickly as possible; Slowking's Judge, the player predicts if the tennis ball will land in or out of the court; Sneasel's Fakeout, a rock paper scissors-like game for two players; Battlefield, where two to six players battle for the highest score; and Celebi's Clock, which is essentially a clock with date, alarm and stopwatch function.
  A pinball game with several levels where a Diglett or a Pikachu acts as the 'bumping' mechanism.
  A collection of different puzzle-games such as: Shadow Puzzle, where different shapes are put together to make an image of a Pokémon; Motion Puzzle, a sliding game where an image of a Pokémon has to be unscrambled; Escape, where one has to move blocks to let a Pokémon out of a maze; and a bonus for completing most of your Minidex is the game Power On, a Pipe Dream-like game where one has to connect a Pikachu to a light bulb, creating a circuit).
  A small collection of four playing card games featuring Pokémon-themed cards and characters from the Pokémon anime.

Due to low sales, no further games for the system were released in North America.

One more game was then released in Japan and Europe:
 Pokémon Tetris, released in Japan as : Tetris with Pokémon. In addition to traditional piece rotation, shaking the system will cause falling pieces to flip. Clearing lines will unlock Pokémon from Pokémon Gold and Silver in the Pokédex.

All subsequent games were only released in Japan (though they eventually all received Fan translations):
  Similar to the first puzzle collection, but some games are different and there are 80 new puzzles.
  A platform racing competition where the player controls a Pikachu racing against other Pokémon.
  A collection of several mini-games, similar to Pokémon Party mini.
  A top-down action puzzle game. The player guides Togepi out of a tower, avoiding traps by tilting the system.
  A virtual pet game. The player cares for a young Pokémon, such as Treecko, Torchic and Mudkip.

Homebrew
Through reverse engineering the Pokémon Mini was hacked; since then it has been possible to program the Pokémon Mini for homebrew purposes. A demo SHizZLE which was released at Breakpoint in 2005 caused some excitement within the demoscene and media.

Notes

References

External links

 Pokémon mini page on Nintendo's official Japanese site 
 Pokémon-Mini.net - Pokémon Mini Database and Dev Site by Team Pokémé
 Pokémon mini development Wiki (technical information)
 Pokémon Mini at NinDB

Handheld game consoles
Monochrome video game consoles
Nintendo consoles
2000s toys
Products introduced in 2001
Products introduced in 2002
Mini
Sixth-generation video game consoles